The United States U-15 boys national soccer team represents the United States in tournaments and friendly matches at the under-15 level. They have appeared in two CONCACAF Boys' Under-15 Championships, in 2017 and 2019.

Competitive record
 Champions   Runners-up   Third place   Fourth place

CONCACAF Boys' Under-15 Championship

Results and schedule
The following is a list of match results from the previous 12 months, as well as any future matches that have been scheduled.

 Legend

Players

Current squad
23 players were called up for the Tampa 2023 Camp.

Recent call-ups
The following players were called up in the past 12 months.

 2022 Kansas City Training Camp; October 2022 
 2022 Torneo delle Nazioni; April 2022

Head coaches
This list may be incomplete.
  Tony Lepore (2011–2013)
  Hugo Pérez (2013–2014)
  John Hackworth (2014–2015)
  Dave van den Bergh (2016–2018)
  Clint Peay (2018–2019)
  Gonzalo Segares (2020–2021)
  Tom Heinemann (2022−present)

References

External links
 U-15 Boys' National Team

North American national under-15 association football teams
Youth soccer in the United States
Soc
U15
U15